Almenno is an area beside the river Brembo in northern Italy. It is now divided between the communes of

Almenno San Bartolomeo
Almenno San Salvatore